Mehmed Fikretov (Bulgarian: Мехмед Фикретов; born ) is a retired Bulgarian male weightlifter, most recently competing in the 69 kg division at the 2008 European Weightlifting Championships.

Career
Fikretov was among 11 athletes on the Bulgarian Weightlifting Federation that tested positive for Metandienone in an out of competition drug test. The Bulgarian Weightlifting Federation then decided to withdraw from the 2008 Olympic Games. The athletes that were banned from the 2008 Olympic Games are:

 Velichko Cholakov
 Demir Demirev
 Mehmed Fikretov
 Ivaylo Filev
 Gergana Kirilova
 Milka Maneva
 Georgi Markov (Lifetime ban)
 Ivan Markov
 Donka Mincheva
 Ivan Stoitsov
 Alan Tsagaev (Lifetime ban)

Major results

References

1986 births
Living people
Bulgarian male weightlifters
20th-century Bulgarian people
21st-century Bulgarian people